Hideout in the Sun is a 1960 nudist film, produced by Doris Wishman and co-directed by Wishman and Larry "Lazarus" Wolk. It stars Greg Conrad, Dolores Carlos and Earl Bauer.

Plot
Brothers Duke and Steve Martin (Conrad and Bauer) hold up a bank. Their escape plans go awry, however, and they kidnap Dorothy (Carlos) and force her to hide them at her members-only nudist camp. Steve and Dorothy spend the afternoon mingling with the camp's patrons and Steve grows increasingly fond of both Dorothy and of nudism. In order to protect her, Steve convinces Duke to flee the camp with him. After an argument, Duke knocks Steve unconscious and escapes with their ill-gotten gains into the Miami Serpentarium, a roadside attraction. Alerted by a clerk, a policeman arrives to arrest Duke, who is bitten by a cobra and dies. Meanwhile, Steve returns to the nudist camp, proclaims his love for Dorothy, and awaits his arrest. Dorothy promises to wait for his release.

Cast
 Greg Conrad as Duke Martin
 Dolores Carlos as Dorothy Courtney, who also appeared in Diary of a Nudist (1961)
 Earl Bauer as Steve Martin
 Carol Little as Betty
 Ann Richards as Ann
 Mary Jane Line as Mary
 Pat Reilly as Pat
 Fran Stacey as Fran
 Dick Falcon as Dick
 Richard Schmitz as George
 Olivia Ann Line as Olivia
 John C. Line as John
 Paul C. Line as Paul
 Walter Film as Rodriquez

See also
 List of American films of 1960
Nudity in film

References

External links
Article on Doris Wishman in German

1960 films
American LGBT-related films
1960s English-language films
American sexploitation films
Films directed by Doris Wishman
1960s American films